A Lethal Dose of Truth is the debut studio album of the Chicago-based thrash metal band Sylencer released in 2012 by their independent label, Sylencer Records, Inc.

Track listing

Reception 
Angela from metal-temple.com rated the album 10/10 and said: "A Lethal Dose Of Truth” was six long years in the making, with an incredible list of guest musicians, including Gene Hoglan, Brendon Small, Andy LaRocque, Steve DiGiorgio, and others. Everything is intense and driving on this album. 15 epic tracks of controlled chaos that will not leave your CD player."

Credits 
Sylencer
Markus Johansson – vocals, guitars
Johnny Rox – bass guitar
Kevin Talley – drums, percussion (Tracks 1-13)

Guest Musicians
Larry Tarnowski – lead guitar (Tracks 1-3, 5-12)
Metal Mike Chlasciak – lead guitar (Track 3)
Emil Werstler – lead guitar (Track 4)
Michael Angelo Batio – lead guitar (Track 7)
Roland Grapow – lead guitar (Track 7)
Steve DiGiorgio – bass guitar (Track 8)
Rob Caggiano – lead guitar (Track 10)
Jordan Rudess – keyboards (Track 10)
Christian Lasegue – lead guitar (Track 10)
Andy LaRocque – lead guitar (Track 11)
Marco Minnemann – drums (Track 14)
Steve Smyth – lead guitar (Track 15)
Sean Reinert – drums (Track 15)
The Heathen – lead vocals (Track 16)
Brendon Small – lead guitar (Track 16)
Gene Hoglan – drums (Track 16)

Production 
Markus Johansson – Producer, Vocal Production
Christian Olde Wolbers – Vocal Production
Orlando Villasenor – Mixing
Maor Appelbaum – Mastering
 Gianluca Trombetta - Editing, Engineer

References

External links 
Official Website

2012 debut albums
Sylencer albums